Japanese Industrial Standards (JIS) has standard JIS-C-7012 for semiconductor part numbers. The first digit denotes the p-n junction count ("3" may also denote a dual-gate FET); then follows the letter "S", then:

Then follows the Japan Electronics and Information Technology Industries Association's Electronic DEvice REgistration Center (JEITA-EDEREC)-assigned part number, optionally followed by suffixes (such as "A", "B", "C", or "R", "O", "BL", standing for "Red", "Orange", "Blue" etc.) to denote variants, such as tighter hFE (gain) groupings.

Example: 2SD965, but sometimes the "2S" prefix is not marked on the package – a 2SD965 might only be marked "D965"; a 2SC1815 might be listed by a supplier as simply "C1815", thus possibly creating confusion with Pro Electron abbreviated markings, because a transistor marked "D965" might either be a 2SD965 or a BD965.

References

See also
JEDEC
Pro Electron
Mullard–Philips tube designation
RMA tube designation
RETMA tube designation
Russian tube designations

Electrical components
Electrical standards
Electronics lists
JIS standards